Mademoiselle Swing is a 1942 French musical film directed by Richard Pottier and starring Irène de Trebert, Jean Murat and Raymond Legrand. It was shot at the It was shot at the Photosonor Studios in Paris. The film's sets were designed by the art director Robert Dumesnil.

Synopsis
A young woman with a passion for swing music is bored with her life in provincial Angoulême. When a troupe of swing musicians pass through the town, she decides to follow them to Paris.

Cast
 Irène de Trebert as Irène Dumontier  
 Jean Murat as Armand de Vinci  
 Raymond Legrand as Raymond Serre et son orchestre  
 Elvire Popesco as Sofia de Vinci  
 Pierre Mingand as Pierre Dornier  
 Saturnin Fabre as Grégoire Dimitresco  
 René Génin as Durieu  
 Max Elloy as Max  
 André Carnège as Le directeur du journal  
 Paul Demange as Le chef de gare  
 Émile Riandreys as Le secrétaire de l'orchestre 
 Albert Brouett as Un membre de l'association 
 Marcel Charvey as Le barman  
 Édouard Francomme as Un bagagiste  
 Maurice Marceau as Villard, le rédacteur des spectacles  
 Jean Maugier as Le brigadier  
 Geneviève Morel as Une chanteuse du 'Trio'  
 Colette Régis as La dame de l'association

References

Bibliography 
 Mike Zwerin. Swing Under the Nazis: Jazz as a Metaphor for Freedom. Cooper Square Press, 2000.

External links 
 

1942 films
1940s French-language films
Films directed by Richard Pottier
1942 musical films
French musical films
French black-and-white films
1940s French films
Films set in Paris